Palmyra is a village in Macoupin County, Illinois, United States. The population was 605 at the 2020 census, down from 698 in 2010.

History
The first home in the Palmyra area was a log cabin built in 1835 by William Owens.

The town originally was named "Newburg", then changed to "Cummington" and finally was platted as Palmyra in 1855.

Palmyra High School was established in 1892. It closed in 1948 as it combined with three other small towns.

Landmarks

Palmyra Opera House 
In November 1902, Clarence Grimett bought a half interest in land and a building at the corner of Main and State streets in Palmyra, where Joseph Waters later joined him in operating a general store. In about 1905, they built a basement oven, hired a baker, and began selling baked goods. After they opened a second-floor theater for presentation of plays and touring performers, the entire establishment became known as the Palmyra Opera House. After a long history as the center of town activity and many years of ownership by Joyce and Rosco Bettis, the Palmyra Opera House was re-opened as a restaurant in November 1999 by Rick Creasy.

Palmyra Castle 

Geography
Palmyra is located in northwestern Macoupin County at  (39.433980, -89.995424). Illinois Route 111 passes through the village as Main Street, leading north  to Waverly and southwest  to Medora.

Solomon Creek, part of the Macoupin Creek watershed leading to the Illinois River, flows southward along the western border of the village.

Demographics

As of the census of 2000, there were 733 people, 334 households, and 223 families residing in the village. The racial makeup of the village was 98.77% White, 0.41% African American, 0.41% Native American, 0.14% Pacific Islander, and 0.27% from two or more races. Hispanic or Latino of any race were 0.55% of the population.

There were 334 households, of which 23.7% had children under the age of 18 living with them, 50.9% were married couples living together, 11.7% had a female householder with no husband present, and 33.2% were non-families. 28.4% of all households were made up of individuals, and 18.9% had someone living alone who was 65 years of age or older. The average household size was 2.19 and the average family size was 2.63.

In the village, the population was spread out, with 20.1% under the age of 18, 7.8% from 18 to 24, 24.0% from 25 to 44, 25.0% from 45 to 64, and 23.2% who were 65 years of age or older. The median age was 44 years. For every 100 females, there were 91.4 males. For every 100 females age 18 and over, there were 87.2 males.

The median income for a household in the village was $27,188, and the median income for a family was $36,250. Males had a median income of $29,583 versus $18,667 for females. The per capita income for the village was $14,801. About 10.1% of families and 14.7% of the population were below the poverty line, including 19.1% of those under age 18 and 12.1% of those age 65 or over.

Notable people

 Richard Grace, justice of the North Dakota Supreme Court
 Joe McManus, pitcher for the Cincinnati Reds
 Earle Benjamin Searcy, Illinois state legislator

References

Villages in Macoupin County, Illinois
Villages in Illinois